Crowded may refer to: 
A place with a crowd
 Crowded (song), 2006 song by Jeanie Ortega
 "Crowded", a 1969 song by Nazz on Nazz (album) 
Crowded (TV series), the 2016 television series
Crowded (comic book), 2018 comic book series

See also
Crowd (disambiguation)